Nkeyema is a constituency of the National Assembly of Zambia. It was created in 2016. It covers Nkeyema District in Western Province.

List of MPs

References 

Constituencies of the National Assembly of Zambia

2016 establishments in Zambia

Constituencies established in 2016